Stalwart is an adjective synonymous with "strong". It may also refer to:

Relating to people:
 Stalwart (politics), member of the most patronage-oriented faction of the United States Republican Party in the late 19th century

In ships and military vehicles:
 HMAS Stalwart, any of several ships in the Royal Australian Navy
 USS Stalwart, any of several ships in the U.S. Navy
 RSS Stalwart (72), a Formidable-class frigate of the Singapore Navy
 Alvis Stalwart, a highly mobile amphibious military truck
 Any of several Stalwart class tactical auxiliary general ocean surveillance ships of the U.S. Navy

Other:
 Ulmus 'Morton Stalwart', an elm hybrid cultivar tree
 Stalwart, Michigan, a community in Raber Township
 Stalwart, Saskatchewan, a hamlet in the Saskatchewan province in Canada.
 Stalwart Esports, Indian Professional Esports Organisation